A Less Bad World is a 2004 Argentine drama film directed by Alejandro Agresti and focused on the Argentina's Dirty War.

Plot
In the early 2000s Isabel (Mónica Galán) discovers that her husband Cholo (Carlos Roffé), who vanished 20 years before as a desaparecido, a victim of the Dirty War by the Argentine military junta, is still alive. She decides to meet him again and, together with her daughters, travels to the small sea village near Patagonia where he has moved to. Her two daughters are Sonia (Julieta Cardinali), the adolescent daughter of Cholo that has never met her father, and Beba (Agustina Noya), a girl of around 8 years old, daughter of another man.

Once in the village, Isabel at first doesn't feel able to meet Cholo, who works as a baker. Apparently, he has told the villagers that his family died in a car accident. When Isabel meets Cholo, the man appears not to recognize her. During the film the choice of Cholo is explained: he vanished from Buenos Aires trying to forget the trauma of the years of the dictatorship, when he and Isabel were communist militants, and he was imprisoned and tortured for a period. In the end, after a long letter written by Sonia to her father, Cholo decides to resume contact with the three women.

Cast

Carlos Roffé: Cholo
Mónica Galán: Isabel
Julieta Cardinali: Sonia
Mex Urtizberea: Miguel
Ulises Dumont: Mario
Rodrigo Noya: Marcelo
Lidia Catalano: Floria
Agustina Noya: Beba
Eduardo Argaranaz: Lalo

Awards
2004: Best Film of the "Award of the City of Rome" (61st Venice International Film Festival)

References

External links

2004 films
Argentine drama films
Films directed by Alejandro Agresti
Films scored by Philippe Sarde
Dirty War films
2000s Argentine films